Grabanina  is a village in the administrative district of Gmina Nowy Żmigród, within Jasło County, Podkarpackie Voivodeship, in south-eastern Poland.

The village has a population of 150.

References

Grabanina